The 1957–58 season was West Ham's nineteenth season in the Second Division since their relegation in season 1931–32. The club were managed by Ted Fenton and the team captain was Noel Cantwell.

Season summary
The season started badly for West Ham with only three wins from their first 10 games. However, after September 1957 they lost only three games hitting the first place in the league on 18 January 1958. They were in first place for all but one week until the end of the season as they finished as champions.  John Dick was the top scorer with 26 goals in all competitions and 21 in the league. The next highest scorer was Vic Keeble with 24. Dick and Ken Brown made the most appearances; 48 in all competitions. West Ham made the fifth round of the FA Cup before being eliminated 3-2 by Fulham.

The season saw the last West Ham appearance for future football manager Malcolm Allison who had to retire following the removal of a lung after contracting tuberculosis. It also saw the first appearance by 1965 Cup Winners' Cup winner, Joe Kirkup. In this season, West Ham created a player of the season award, the Hammer of the Year award. The first winner was Andy Malcolm. This season also saw the club break its record for the biggest victory. On 8 March 1958 they beat Rotherham United, 8-0 with John Dick scoring four goals.

Second Division

Results
West Ham United's score comes first

Legend

Football League Second Division

FA Cup

Squad

References

West Ham United F.C. seasons
West Ham United F.C. season
West Ham United F.C. season
West Ham United